Bilyky is an urban-type settlement in Poltava Raion of Poltava Oblast in Ukraine. It is located on the right bank of the Vorskla, a left tributary of the Dnieper. Bilyky belongs to Bilyky settlement hromada, one of the hromadas of Ukraine. Population: 

Until 18 July 2020, Bilyky belonged to Kobeliaky Raion. The raion was abolished in July 2020 as part of the administrative reform of Ukraine, which reduced the number of raions of Poltava Oblast to four. The area of Kobeliaky Raion was merged into Poltava Raion.

Economy

Transportation
To the north, Bilyky has access to the Highway M22 connecting Poltava with Oleksandriia via Kremenchuk. To the south, it has road connections with Kobeliaky.

Lishchynivka railway station is located in Bilyky. It is on the railway which connects Poltava and Kremenchuk. There is infrequent passenger traffic.

References

Urban-type settlements in Poltava Raion
Kobelyaksky Uyezd